Project South may refer to:
Project South, a non-profit organization in Atlanta, Georgia
Proyecto Sur (Project South), a political party in Argentina